Gravity Pulls is the fifth album by English rock band Echobelly.

Track listing
All songs written by Sonya Madan and Glenn Johansson.
 "Gravity Pulls" – 4:19
 "To Get Me Thru the Good Times" – 4:18
 "You Started a Fire in the Heart of a Wasted Life" – 4:02
 "Djinn" – 4:42
 "Big Sky Mind" – 6:05
 "Strangely Drawn" – 3:00
 "A Good Day" – 3:45
 "What You Deserve" – 4:20
 "One in a Million" – 3:22
 "All Tomorrow Brings" – 4:41

Personnel
Adapted from Discogs.
Echobelly
 Sonya Madan - vocals 
 Glenn Johansson - guitar, piano, keyboards 
 Ruth Owen - bass
 Andy Henderson - drums
with:
 Kate Sawbridge - cello
 Hannah Dawson - violin
Technical
 Richard Matthews - engineer
 Bunt Stafford-Clark - mastering
 Ian Grimble - producer

References

2004 albums
Echobelly albums